Bilandu is a village development committee in Okhaldhunga District in the Sagarmatha Zone of mid-eastern Nepal. At the time of the 1991 Nepal census it had a population of 2279 living in 431 individual households. On December 15, 2010 a plane crashed in the forest of Bilandu, near the village of Shreechaur in the adjacent village development committee.

References

External links
UN map of the municipalities of Okhaldhunga District

Populated places in Okhaldhunga District